Leonardo Yassir Zabala Zeballos (born 23 May 2003) is a Bolivian football player who plays as central defender for Brazilian club Santos and the Bolivia national team.

Club career
Zabala began playing football at the age of four with local side . In September 2019, after representing Club Calleja, he joined Palmeiras after standing out in a local tournament.

On 23 September 2021, Zabala signed a contract with Santos until December 2022, being initially assigned to the under-20s. On 7 June of the following year, he further extended his deal until December 2023.

On 16 March 2023, after already being involved in first team trainings, Zabala further extended his link until the end of 2025.

International career
On 9 October 2020, Zabala debuted for the Bolivia national team in a 5-0 2022 FIFA World Cup qualification loss to Brazil.

Personal life
Zabala is the nephew of the Bolivian international footballer Wilder Zabala.

Career statistics

International

References

External links
 

2003 births
Living people
Sportspeople from Santa Cruz de la Sierra
Bolivian footballers
Bolivia international footballers
Bolivia under-20 international footballers
Bolivia youth international footballers
Association football defenders
Bolivian expatriate footballers
Bolivian expatriates in Brazil
Expatriate footballers in Brazil